Carlos Conrado Jiménez Hurtado (born 10 February 1948) is a Bolivian former footballer who played as a goalkeeper. He played in 36 matches for the Bolivia national football team from 1973 to 1981. He was also part of Bolivia's squad for the 1975 Copa América tournament.

References

External links
 

1948 births
Living people
1979 Copa América players
Association football goalkeepers
Bolivian footballers
Bolivia international footballers
Chaco Petrolero players
Club Bolívar players
People from José Miguel de Velasco Province